The FPV F6 is an automobile that was produced in Australia by Ford Performance Vehicles from 2004 until 2014. It is a high-performance derivative of the Australian Ford Falcon.

The F6 is based on the modern-classic Ford Falcon XR6 Turbo sports sedan. The F6 engine is based on XR6T motor, a turbocharged intercooled DOHC 4.0L Inline Six with VCT, but includes: a modified FPV airbox (with Dual Ram Air intakes), higher strength conrods, larger air-to-air intercooler, high flow exhaust system, higher capacity fuel pump, and a Garrett GT3582r (same as the BA/BF XR6T) turbocharger with an internal waste gate (up from the GT3576r on the FG XR6T) running 0.64 bar of boost on the BA/BF models and 0.91 on the FG. This engine is known for its wide, flat torque curve, with peak torque of  available from 1950 to 5250 rpm (FG F6). This equates to strong acceleration throughout the rev range.

The F6 represented a diversification of sorts for FPV, broadening the reach of the brand to turbo buyers, a typically younger demographic than the V8 buyers that the Australian manufacturers traditionally cater to.

Models 
During the BA-BF series, the F6 sedan was known as the "Typhoon", and the utility based version as the "Tornado". Upon the release of the FG series, the names were dropped and the product using F6 only. FPV also developed the Force 6 as a luxury orientated version of the F6, and a Territory based F6-X.

BA Series

BA MKII (2004-2005)
The F6 Typhoon first emerged in FPV's late-2004 BA MkII facelift. It was only offered with a Tremec T-56 6-speed manual gearbox. The car had a more low-key look than the V8-powered FPV's with a lower rear wing, no body stripes. The F6 had  alloy wheels, and PBR /2-piston brakes offered as standard with /4-piston Brembos offered as a $5K option.

BF Series

BF MKI (2005–2006) 
With the BF update of 2005 came no power or torque increases, but a host of different updates in other areas. A ZF 6-speed sequential automatic transmission became available. The other key update was a brake upgrade - a Brembo 355 mm/4-piston package becoming standard, with a 355 mm/6-piston package is optional. The F6 also scored a more aggressive bodykit to further differentiate it from other vehicles in the FPV range, as well as  "Dark Argent" Alloys.

The F6 Tornado Ute entered production in May 2005.

BF MkII (2006–2008)

The F6 Typhoon did not get any mechanical upgrades with the BF MkII update of late-2006. Minor changes included new design alloy wheels and a change to graphite fog-lamp surrounds (instead of body-coloured). FPV also introduced the luxury focused Force 6 during the MKII update. Often mistaken as a limited edition, it is not. It is simply a low volume car. They made as many as got ordered. 

In 2007 300 limited edition "R Spec" versions of the BF MKII F6 Typhoon were made available. The FPV BF MKII F6 Typhoon Rspec is the only limited edition turbo FPV and the only turbo Rspec ever. This will undoubtedly make it one of the most desirable and collectable turbo FPV's. This model was equipped with several upgrades including stiffer suspension and 19'x8" alloy wheels which sought to improve the car's handling. Additional upgrades also included leather seats as standard, R Spec floor mats, interior car console MP3 accessory port and F6 R Spec build plates and badging. Colours that the R Spec Typhoon was released in included winter white, lightning strike, vixen, neo, ego, bionic and silhouette. Apart from their badging, R Spec Typhoons can be identified by their thunderstorm grey inserts seen on the front and rear bumper bars, fog light surrounds, rear spoiler pillars and alloy wheels.
The R spec model was also available as a special order in custom option colour choice, At least two are known to be in Fords "Conquer Blue Metallic" with the dark ardent inserts.

FG Series

FG MKI (2008–2011) FPV released a new FG Falcon-based range in 2008, including F6 models which no longer used the Typhoon and Tornado monikers. Key changes included new front suspension, a new steering rack, all-new exterior and interior design and a revised 6-speed manual transmission with launch control. The brake specifications, and the ZF 6-speed automatic remained unchanged. In 2008, it won New Zealand Autocar Magazine's Car of the Year Award.

The F6E, an executive variant of the F6, was announced in July 2009 for sale from September. Often mistaken as a limited edition, it is not. It is simply a low volume car. They made as many as got ordered. 

FG MKII(2011-2014)
The MKII update gave the F6 new wheels, and projector headlamps from the MKII Falcon update. During 2012, ProDrive sold their share in the FPV company, liquidating it. All FPV models, including the FG F6, were produced in Ford's own factory.

Motor magazine controversy 
In 2005, the BAII F6 Typhoon was disqualified from Motor magazine's annual Performance Car of the Year competition due to a series of clutch failures. After initially blaming the magazine's testers, FPV labelled the car as "simply too powerful" and withdrew the car from sale for several months while they engineered a fix. All of the cars released with the clutch issues were recalled.

The F6 Typhoon returned to win Motor magazine's Australian Performance Car of the Year award in 2006.

See also

Ford Falcon GT
Ford Performance Vehicles
Tickford Vehicle Engineering

References

External links 
 FPV F6 FG Series brochure - January 2009 As archived at www.webcitation.org on 18 December 2009

Cars of Australia
F6 Typoon
Full-size vehicles
Pickup trucks
Rear-wheel-drive vehicles
Sports sedans